East Lake Cherry Blossom Park, also called Wuhan Moshan Cherry Blossom Park, is a park in the East Lake area of Wuchang District, Wuhan City, Hubei Province, China.  The Japanese cherry trees were planted in this area near Wuhan University during the Japanese Army's occupation of Wuhan, and were continued to be planted after the Second World War.  It is one of the two most famous cherry blossom parks in China, the other being Longwangtang Cherry Blossom Park in Lushunkou District, Dalian, Liaoning.

See also
 East Lake
 Cherry blossoms in China

References

Parks in Hubei
Cherry blossom
Tourist attractions in Wuhan